USCGC Modoc may refer to the following vessels of the United States Coast Guard:

  (WPG-46), a  cutter which served from 1992–1947
 , a tug which served from 1959–1979, under the name USCGC Modoc (WATA-194), after serving in the United States Navy as Bagaduce
Modoc may refer to the following vessels of the United States Navy:
 , formally Enterprise and YT-16, a tug which served the US Navy from 1898 to 1947

United States Coast Guard ship names
United States Navy ship names